The 2015–16 North Dakota Fighting Hawks Men's Basketball team represented the University of North Dakota during the 2015–16 NCAA Division I men's basketball season. They were led by tenth year head coach Brian Jones and played their home games at the Betty Engelstad Sioux Center. They were members of the Big Sky Conference. They finished the season 17–16, 10–8 in Big Sky play to finish in a tie for fifth place. They defeated Southern Utah and Idaho State to advance to the semifinals of the Big Sky tournament where they lost to Weber State. They were invited to the CollegeInsider.com Tournament where they lost in the first round to UC Irvine.

Previous season
North Dakota finished the season 8–22, 4–14 in Big Sky play to finish in a three-way tie for tenth place. They failed to qualify for the Big Sky tournament.

Departures

Incoming transfers

2015 incoming recruits

2016 incoming recruits

Roster

Schedule

|-
!colspan=9 style="background:#009E60; color:white;"| Non-conference regular season

|-
!colspan=9 style="background:#009E60; color:white;"| Big Sky regular season

|-
!colspan=9 style="background:#009E60; color:white;"| Big Sky tournament

|-
!colspan=9 style="background:#009E60; color:white;"| CIT

References

North Dakota Fighting Hawks men's basketball seasons
North Dakota
North Dakota
Fight
Fight